Phú Phong is a town (thị trấn) in south central Vietnam. It is the capital of Tây Sơn District in Bình Định Province.

Geography and Transport
Phú Phong is located in the very west of the lowland plain of southern Bình Định along Côn River and the smaller Cút River, one of its tributaries. Côn River is an inland waterway that can be used for transport and provides indirect access to the sea as well as further up to Vĩnh Thạnh District.

Phú Phong is also located at National Road 19, which connects it to National Route 1 (26 km distance), the ports of Quy Nhon (42 km) in the east and the Central Highlands in the west, including An Khê town (34 km), Pleiku city (129 km), and the border to Cambodia.

History and Heritage Sites
Phú Phong was granted town status in March 1979 (having been a village before that). It was expanded in 2006 and aims to become a level 4 urban settlement.

There is a temple commemorating the Tây Sơn dynasty, which originated in the Tây Sơn District, as well as an ancestral temple dedicated to Bui Thi Xuan, one of its major generals, and a Tây Sơn Museum.

Several Cham temple towers are located in Binh Nghi Commune to the east of the town.

References

Populated places in Bình Định province
District capitals in Vietnam
Townships in Vietnam